The Leinster Senior Football Championship, known simply as the Leinster Championship and shortened to Leinster SFC, is an annual inter-county Gaelic football competition organised by the Leinster Council of the Gaelic Athletic Association (GAA). It is the highest inter-county Gaelic football competition in the province of Leinster, and has been contested every year since the 1888 championship.

The final, currently held on the fourth Sunday in June, serves as the culmination of a series of games played during May and June, and the results determine which team receives the Delaney Cup. The championship has always been played on a straight knockout basis whereby once a team loses they are eliminated from the championship.

The Leinster Championship is an integral part of the wider GAA Football All-Ireland Senior Championship. The winners of the Leinster final, like their counterparts in Connacht, Munster and Ulster, are rewarded by advancing directly to the All-Ireland quarter finals. Some of the defeated teams advance to the All-Ireland Qualifiers, while others continue in the Taitleann Cup.

11 teams currently participate in the Leinster Championship. One of the most successful team in Gaelic football, namely Dublin, play their provincial football in the Leinster Championship and have won the title on a record 60 occasions while they have also claimed 30 All-Ireland Championship titles.

The title has been won at least once by 11 of the Leinster counties, eight of which have won the title more than once. Wicklow are the only team never to have won the title, while three-time winners Kilkenny no longer participate. The championship has been dominated since the beginning by Dublin, who are also the current champions.

Current team details
The following teams will compete during the 2023 championship.

2023 teams

History

Development
Following the foundation of the Gaelic Athletic Association in 1884, new rules for Gaelic football and hurling were drawn up and published in the United Irishman newspaper. In 1886, county committees began to be established, with several counties affiliating over the next few years. The GAA ran its inaugural All-Ireland Senior Football Championship in 1887. The decision to establish that first championship was influenced by several factors. Firstly, inter-club contests in 1885 and 1886 were wildly popular and began to draw huge crowds. Clubs started to travel across the country to play against each other and these matches generated intense interest as the newspapers began to speculate which teams might be considered the best in the country. Secondly, although the number of clubs was growing, many were slow to affiliate to the Association, leaving it short of money. Establishing a central championship held the prospect of enticing GAA clubs to process their affiliations, just as the establishment of the FA Cup had done much in the 1870s to promote the development of the Football Association in England. The championships were open to all affiliated clubs who would first compete in county-based competitions, to be run by local county committees. The winners of each county championship would then proceed to represent that county in the All-Ireland series. For the first and only time in its history the All-Ireland Championship used an open draw format. 12 teams entered the first championship, however, this number increased to 15 in 1888. Because of this, and in an effort to reduce travelling costs, the GAA decided to introduce provincial championships.

Beginnings
The inaugural Leinster Championship featured Dublin, Kildare, Kilkenny, Louth, Meath, Queen's County, Wexford and Wicklow. Dublin and Kildare contested the very first match on Sunday 3 June 1888. Wicklow beat Wexford in the third quarter-final a month later, however, a replay was ordered after the game was stopped with ten minutes to go as a result of a pitch invasion, and it was also revealed that Wicklow had played a number of illegal player. Postponements, disqualifications, objections, withdrawals and walkovers were regular occurrences during the initial years of the championship. The inaugural Leinster final between Kilkenny and Wexford was played on Sunday 23 September 1888, with Kilkenny claiming a 1–04 to 0–02 victory.

Team dominance
The first years of the Leinster Championship saw one of the most equitable eras in terms of titles won, with five different teams claiming their inaugural titles between 1888 and 1895. In winning the 1892 Leinster final, Dublin, as well as becoming the first team to retain the title, also set in train a level of championship dominance that continues to the present day. After two decades of dominance, Wexford broke the hegemony by setting a new record of six successive titles between 1913 and 1918. Dublin remained the standard-bearers of the province, however, Kildare emerged as a new force, winning eight titles between 1919 and 1935. Since winning their second ever title in 1939, Meath enjoyed some brief periods of dominance and claimed titles in each of the decades that followed to eventually become second only to Dublin in the all-time roll of honour by 1970. A Dublin resurgence in the 1970s was followed by Meath's most successful era, winning eight titles between 1986 and 2001 under Seán Boylan. In the 21st century Dublin set a new record of twelve-in-a-row between 2011 and 2022.

Current format

Overview
The Leinster Championship is a single elimination tournament. Each team is afforded only one defeat before being eliminated from the championship. The draw is seeded, with the previous year's semi-finalists receiving byes to the quarter-finals. Six of the remaining seven teams are drawn together in three first round matches, while the seventh team also receives a bye to the quarter-finals.

In September 2019, the Leinster Council decided against awarding champions Dublin a bye into the semi-final stage; instead deciding to retain the status quo. The Leinster Council did, however, introduce a semi-final draw scheduled for the Sunday night when all quarter-final winners were confirmed, meaning that semi-finalists would not know if they were on the champions' side of the draw until two weeks before the game.

Later 2022 for 2023 campaign a possible system change is needed another team to Dublin is overdue to win the title.

Progression

Qualification for subsequent competitions

As of the 2021 championship, qualification for the All-Ireland Championship will change due to the creation of a tier 2 championship known as the Tailteann Cup. The Leinster champions will directly qualify for the All-Ireland quarter finals. National League Division 3 and 4 teams who fail to reach the Leinster final will automatically qualify for the Tailteann Cup. All other teams from Division 1 and 2 will progress to the All-Ireland Qualifiers.

Venues

History

Leinster Championship matches were traditionally played at neutral venues or at a location that was deemed to be halfway between the two participants; however, teams eventually came to home and away agreements. Every second meeting between these teams is played at the home venue of one of them. Championship semi-finals were usually played both on the same day at Croke Park. The selection of Croke Park for the vast majority of Dublin's games in recent years has also come in for criticism in the 2nd decade of the 21st century, as it offers a perceived advantage to play in what is effectively their "home" stadium. This has continued into the 2020s.

Cavan took part in 1895 when Connacht and Ulster championships were abolished between 1893 and 1899. London played Louth in 1913 championship.

Attendances

Stadium attendances are a significant source of regular income for the Leinster Council and for the teams involved. For the 2018 championship, gate receipts fell by almost 30% to €1,879,326, compared to €2,634,837 the previous year. The average attendance for the entire series of games was just over 20,000, down from a peak of over 60,000 in 2002. The 2006 final between Dublin and Offaly saw a record attendance of 81,754.

Roll of Honour
A golden background denotes years in which the Leinster champions also won the All-Ireland Championship.

Finals

Managers

Managers in the Leinster Championship are involved in the day-to-day running of the team, including the training, team selection, and sourcing of players from the club championships. Their influence varies from county-to-county and is related to the individual county boards. From 2018, all inter-county head coaches must be Award 2 qualified. The manager is assisted by a team of two or three selectors and an extensive backroom team consisting of various coaches. Prior to the development of the concept of a manager in the 1970s, teams were usually managed by a team of selectors with one member acting as chairman.

Trophy and medals

At the end of the Leinster final, the winning team is presented with a trophy. The Delaney Cup is held by the winning team until the following year's final. Traditionally, the presentation is made at a special rostrum in the Hogan Stand of Croke Park where GAA and political dignitaries and special guests view the match.

The cup is decorated with ribbons in the colours of the winning team. During the game the cup actually has both teams' sets of ribbons attached and the runners-up ribbons are removed before the presentation. The winning captain accepts the cup on behalf of his team before giving a short speech. Individual members of the winning team and management then have an opportunity to come to the rostrum to lift the cup.

The current cup was first presented after the 1953 final, however, it would be another 50 years before it was named the Delaney Cup. The Delaney brothers were a famous Gaelic football family from Portlaoise who lined out at club, county and provincial level.

In accordance with GAA rules, the Leinster Council awards up to twenty-six gold medals to the winners of the Leinster final.

Sponsorship
Since 1994, the Leinster Championship has been sponsored. The sponsor has usually been able to determine the championship's sponsorship name.

Records and statistics

Teams by decade
The most successful team of each decade, judged by number of Leinster Senior Football Championship titles, is as follows:

 1880s: 1 each for Kilkenny (1888) and Laois (1889)
 1890s: 7 for Dublin (1891-92-94-96-97-98-99)
 1900s: 6 for Dublin (1901-02-04-06-07-08)
 1910s: 6 for Wexford (1913–14-15-16-17-18)
 1920s: 5 for Dublin (1920-21-22-23-24)
 1930s: 3 each for Kildare (1930-31-35), Dublin (1932-33-34) and Laois (1936-37-38)
 1940s: 3 for Meath (1940-47-49)
 1950s: 3 each for Louth (1950-53-57), Meath (1951-52-54) and Dublin (1955-58-59)
 1960s: 3 each for Offaly (1960-61-69), Dublin (1962-63-65) and Meath (1964-66-67)
 1970s: 6 for Dublin (1974-75-76-77-78-79)
 1980s: 4 for Dublin (1983-84-85-89)
 1990s: 4 each for Meath (1990-91-96-99) and Dublin (1992-93-94-95)
 2000s: 6 for Dublin (2002-05-06-07-08-09)
 2010s: 9 for Dublin (2011-12-13-14-15-16-17-18-19)

Other records

Gaps

 Longest gaps between successive Leinster titles:
 57 years: Laois (1946–2003)
 44 years: Meath (1895–1939)
 42 years: Kildare (1956–1998)
 31 years: Louth (1912–1943)
 20 years: Wexford (1925–1945)

Longest undefeated run

The record for the longest unbeaten run stands at 30 games held by Dublin. It began with a 1–16 to 0–11 win over Laois on 5 June 2011 and continues as of a 3–21 to 0–09 win over Meath on 21 November 2020.

Players

Top scorers

All time

By year

Single game

Finals

Leinster medal winners

Team progress since 2001
Below is a record of each county's performance since the introduction of the qualifier system to the All-Ireland series in 2001. Qualifiers did not occur from 2020 onwards due to the impact of the COVID-19 pandemic on Gaelic games.
Key

See also
 All-Ireland Senior Football Championship
 Ulster Senior Football Championship
 Munster Senior Football Championship
 Connacht Senior Football Championship

References

Sources
 Roll of Honour from Leinster GAA website

 
 1
3